Susumu Noguchi (June 1, 1908May 1, 1961) was a Japanese professional boxer who was best known for winning the Japanese Welterweight title.

In June 1931, Susumu Noguchi tried bombing Junnosuke Inoue's residence. Susumu Noguchi served a short prison sentence.

In 1933 Noguchi was arrested for trying to assassinate the politician Wakatsuki Reijirō, an important Japanese politician when the minister departed at Ueno Station in Tokyo in protest of the London Naval Treaty.

Susumu Noguchi is the founder of  Noguchi boxing gym which produced notable Japanese boxers such as Hitoshi Misako and Hiroyuki Ebihara.

Personal life
Susumu Noguchi had two sons, flyweight boxer Kyō Noguchi and Osamu Noguchi, founder of the sport Kickboxing.

References

External links
Noguchi Gym

1908 births
1961 deaths
People from Tokyo
Welterweight boxers
Japanese male boxers